The Rotbach (in its upper reaches it is called the Zartenbach and Löffeltalbach, in its middle section, the Höllenbach) is the 19.9-kilometre-long, left-hand and southeasterly headstream of the  Dreisam in the Southern Black Forest in the south German state of Baden-Württemberg.

Zartenbach 
The headstreams of the upper reaches of the Rotbach, known as the Zartenbach, begin on the territory of Hinterzarten (Southern Black Forest Nature Park) southwest of the village of Oberzarten on the eastern mountainside of the Ramselehöhe (1,111,9 m) at about 1,085 metres above sea level. They gather on the bottom of a valley basin with a stepped longitudinal profile that was formed by an ice age glacier. On one of the levels the stream is impounded to form the pond of Mathisleweiher. Thereafter it flows in a broad left-hand arc around the Windeck (1,209 m) and passes through Oberzarten and Hinterzarten northwards in the broad hollow of the level Hinterzarten Moor (nature reserve).

Löffeltalbach 
After picking up the outflow of the western part of the moor, the stream deepens as it enters a V-shaped valley and descends steeply. The valley is named after the old workshops here that used to make wooden spoons (Holzlöffeln). Through this valley used to run the Löffeltalsteige, the ascent from the Höllental valley to the heights of Hinterzarten.

Höllenbach 
In the Höllental the Löffeltalbach merges with the Ravennabach coming from Ravenna Gorge to the northeast. The stream, now called the Höllenbach, flows northwest initially through the straight trough valley of the upper Höllental which was formed by ice age glaciers. It then comes to a gorge-like section of the valley which is known as the Hirschsprung or Höllenpass. The stream is accompanied by the B 31 and  Höllentalbahn as it continues through the Höllental.

Rotbach 
In the lower section of the valley, the stream continues as the Rotbach through Falkensteig and Himmelreich (villages in the municipality of Buchenbach), where it flows out into the plain of the Zarten Basin.

Sights 

The sights along the Rotbach include the:
 Mathisleweiher (also called the Mathislesweiher or Mathiesleweiher ; source pond of the Zartenbach and Rotbachs)
 Höllental (narrow valley of the Höllenbach/Rotbach)
 Ravenna Gorge and Ravennabach (side valley of the Höllental)
 Tarodunum (ca. 200 ha large Celtic oppidum; east of Kirchzarten)

See also
List of rivers of Baden-Württemberg

References

External links 

Rivers of Baden-Württemberg
Rivers of the Black Forest
Rivers of Germany